David Alexandre Pereira Crespo (born 14 February 1994) is a Portuguese footballer who plays for Oriental as a defender.

Club career
He made his Primeira Liga debut for Nacional on 1 April 2013, when he was a starter in a 2–1 win over against Vitória de Guimarães.

References

External links

Stats and profile at LPFP

1994 births
Footballers from Lisbon
Living people
Portuguese footballers
Association football defenders
C.D. Nacional players
Primeira Liga players
S.C.U. Torreense players
C.D. Mafra players
S.U. Sintrense players